The 2019 Morehead State Eagles football team represents Morehead State University in the 2019 NCAA Division I FCS football season. They are led by seventh-year head coach Rob Tenyer and play their home games at Jayne Stadium. They are members of the Pioneer Football League.

Previous season

The Eagles finished the 2018 season 3–8, 2–6 in PFL play to finish in a three-way tie for seventh place.

Preseason

Preseason coaches' poll
The Pioneer League released their preseason coaches' poll on July 30, 2019. The Eagles were picked to finish tied for ninth place.

Preseason All-PFL teams
The Eagles had one player selected to the preseason all–PFL teams.

Offense

Second team

Jarin Higginbotham – WR

Schedule

Game summaries

Union (KY)

at Illinois State

Kentucky Christian

at Murray State

Davidson

at Jacksonville

Butler

at Drake

Dayton

at Valparaiso

at San Diego

Stetson

References

Morehead State
Morehead State Eagles football seasons
Morehead State Eagles football